Nimisha Suresh is an Indian actress who acts in Malayalam Cinema, mainly in supporting roles.

Movie career
Nimisha Suresh started her career with the film Pachakuthira, directed by  Kamal. She acted in films like Mayavi, directed by Shafi, Payum Puli, Marykkundoru Kunjaadu, Ithu Nammude Katha, Make-up Man, Doctor Love etc.

Filmography

Television
 2015 : Smart Show - Flowers TV

References

External links
 

Indian film actresses
Actresses from Kochi
Living people
Actresses in Malayalam cinema
21st-century Indian actresses
Actresses in Tamil cinema
Year of birth missing (living people)
Actresses in Malayalam television